"Why Don't You Do Right?" (originally recorded as "Weed Smoker's Dream" in 1936) is an American blues and jazz-influenced pop song usually credited to Kansas Joe McCoy. A minor key twelve-bar blues with a few chord substitutions, it is considered a classic "woman's blues" song and has become a standard. Singer Lil Green recorded a popular rendition in 1941, which Peggy Lee recorded the next year — accompanied by Benny Goodman — and made one of her signature songs.

Composition and lyrics
In 1936, the Harlem Hamfats jazz band recorded "The Weed Smoker's Dream". The original Decca Records release listed the songwriters as "McCoy-Moran" (Joe McCoy and Herb Morand were members of the band). McCoy later rewrote the song, refining the composition and lyrics. The new tune, titled "Why Don't You Do Right?", was recorded by Lil Green in 1941, with guitar by William "Big Bill" Broonzy. The recording was an early jazz and blues hit.

The song has its roots in blues music and originally dealt with a marijuana smoker reminiscing about lost financial opportunities.  As it was rewritten, it takes on the perspective of the female partner, who chastises her man for his irresponsible ways, complaining that her other lovers provide her with more money: "Why don't you do right, like some other men do?  Get out of here and get me some money too."

Peggy Lee recordings

One of the best-known versions of the song was recorded by Peggy Lee and Benny Goodman on July 27, 1942, in New York. Featured in the 1943 film, Stage Door Canteen, it sold over one million copies and brought her to nationwide attention.

Lee often stated that Green's recording was influential to her music. In a 1971 interview she said, "I had the record, and I used to play it over and over in my dressing room, which was next to Benny Goodman... Finally... he said, 'I think you really like that song.' I said, 'Oh, I love it.' He said, 'Would you like to sing it?'"  Lee said yes, so Goodman had an arrangement made of it for Lee to sing.

"Why Don't You Do Right?" was not Goodman and Lee's biggest hit. However, it reached number four on the Billboard charts and reached the same position on the Harlem Hit Parade charts.

See also
List of 1930s jazz standards
Who Framed Roger Rabbit (soundtrack)
"Why Don't You"

References

External links

1936 songs
1930s jazz standards
Blues songs
1942 singles
Benny Goodman songs
Peggy Lee songs
Songs about cannabis
1936 in cannabis
Who Framed Roger Rabbit
Disney songs